Charles Gallagher (1925 – 2007) was a Canadian politician in New Brunswick.

Charles Gallagher may also refer to:

Charles Gallagher (British Columbia politician), represented Kootenay (provincial electoral district)
Shorty Gallagher, baseball player

See also
Charlie Gallagher (disambiguation)